Highway 30 is an East-West Highway in Jordan. It starts at Saudi Arabia's border at Umari and connects it to Zarqa and Amman. Then it continues further west passing through Salt and ending in the western end of the country on Highway 65.

See also
Itinerary on Google Maps

Roads in Jordan